Shakespearean tragedy is the designation given to most tragedies written by playwright William Shakespeare. Many of his history plays share the qualifiers of a Shakespearean tragedy, but because they are based on real figures throughout the history of England, they were classified as "histories" in the First Folio. The Roman tragedies—Julius Caesar, Antony and Cleopatra and Coriolanus—are also based on historical figures, but because their sources were foreign and ancient they are almost always classified as tragedies rather than histories. Shakespeare's romances (tragicomic plays) were written late in his career and published originally as either tragedy or comedy. They share some elements of tragedy, insofar as they feature a high-status central character, but they end happily like Shakespearean comedies. Almost three centuries after Shakespeare's death, the scholar F. S. Boas also coined a fifth category, the "problem play," for plays that do not fit neatly into a single classification because of their subject matter, setting, or ending. The classifications of certain Shakespeare plays are still debated among scholars.

Chronology

Below is the list of Shakespeare's plays listed as tragedies in the First Folio, along with the date range in which each play is believed to have been written.

Influences and sources

The English Renaissance, when Shakespeare was writing, was fueled by a renewed interest in Roman and Greek classics and neighboring renaissance literature written years earlier in Italy, France, and Spain. Shakespeare wrote the majority of his tragedies under the rule of James I, and their darker contents may reflect the general mood of the country following the death of Elizabeth I, as well as James' theatrical preferences. Shakespeare, as was customary for other playwrights in his day, used history, other plays, and non-dramatic literature as sources for his plays. In Elizabethan England there were no copyright or protections against plagiarism, so characters, plots, and even whole phrases of poetry were considered common property. The majority of Shakespeare's tragedies are based on historical figures, with the exception of Measure for Measure and Othello, which are based on narrative fictions by Giraldi Cintio. The historical basis for Shakespeare's Roman plays comes from The Lives of Noble Grecians and Romans by Plutarch, whereas the source of Shakespeare's Britain based plays and Hamlet (based on the Danish Prince Amleth) derive from Holinshed's Chronicles. Furthermore, the French author Belleforest published The Hystorie of Hamblet, Prince of Denmarke in 1582 which includes specifics from how the prince counterfeited to be mad, to how the prince stabbed and killed the King's counsellor who was eavesdropping on Hamlet and his mother behind the arras in the Queen's chamber. The story of Lear appears in Geoffrey of Monmouth's Historia regium Britanniae , and then in John Higgins' poem The Mirror for Magistrates in 1574, as well as appearing in Holinshed's Chronicles in 1587. Some events that happen in Shakespeare's King Lear were inspired by various episodes of Philip Sidney's Arcadia from 1590, while the nonsensical musings of Edgar's "poor Tom" heavily reference Samuel Harsnett's 1603 book, A Declaration of Egregious Popish Impostures.

Contemporary tragedy

Tragedies from these eras traced their philosophical essence back to the Senecan tragedy, grounded in nobles who have a tragic flaw or commit a grave error (hamartia) which leads to their reversal of fortune (peripeteia). (However, some critics have argued that the "pseudo-Aristotelian" concept of the tragic flaw does not apply to Shakespeare's tragic figures.) Revenge tragedy was also of increasing popularity in this age; Shakespeare's Hamlet is one example of this. Plays of this age were also decidedly secular, in contrast to the religious morality plays which by this time were outlawed by Elizabeth I. One marked difference between English renaissance tragedies and the classics that inspired them, was the use and popularity of violence and murder on stage.

Select exemplary (non-Shakespearean) Elizabethan and Jacobean tragedies:
 The Spanish Tragedy by Thomas Kyd
 The Jew of Malta by Christopher Marlowe
 Tamburlaine by Christopher Marlowe
 Doctor Faustus by Christopher Marlowe
 Antonio's Revenge by John Marston
 The Revenger's Tragedy by Thomas Middleton
 'Tis Pity She's a Whore by John Ford

Notes and references

Notes

References

Sources

Further reading

External links
 Shakespearean tragedies at the British Library

 
Tragedies
Tragedies (dramas)